Bill Gill (born April 15, 1919, date of death unknown) was a Canadian soccer goalkeeper. He was a member of the Montreal Stelco squad who won the national title in 1952.

In 1952, the year he led Stelco to the national title over Westminster Royals FC, Gill won the McLagan Trophy as Montreal's most valuable player. In 1953, he joined Montréal Hakoah FC and led his new club to the Canadian final, but this time lost the three-game series to Westminster.

References

External links
 / Canada Soccer Hall of Fame

1919 births
Year of death missing
Canadian soccer players
Soccer players from Montreal
Association football goalkeepers